Assos-Lechaio is a former municipality in Corinthia, Peloponnese, Greece. Since the 2011 local government reform it is part of the municipality Corinth, of which it is a municipal unit. The municipal unit has an area of 25.490 km2. Population 6,993 (2011). The seat of the municipality was in Perigiali.

References

Populated places in Corinthia